Domenico De Simone (31 May 1926 – 11 June 2019) was an Italian politician. A member of the Communist Party (PCI), he served as a Senator during Legislature VII (1976–1979) prior to being elected to the Chamber of Deputies during Legislature VIII (1979–1983). De Simone was born in Torremaggiore and served as the town's mayor between 1960 and 1976.

De Simone died on 11 June 2019 in Torremaggiore, at the age of 93.

References

External links
 Domenico De Simone – Chamber of Deputies profile 

1926 births
2019 deaths
Deputies of Legislature VIII of Italy
Italian Communist Party politicians
Mayors of places in Apulia
People from the Province of Foggia
Senators of Legislature VII of Italy